Maria Haukaas Mittet (née Storeng, born 3 August 1979) also known as simply Maria is a Norwegian recording artist. She gained national recognition in 2004 for her participation in the Idol reality television series, and international recognition in 2008 as Norway's representative in the 53rd Eurovision Song Contest.

Biography
Maria was born in Finnsnes, but grew up on the island of Senja, in Troms county, Norway. She first received national media attention when she had her first musical role at the age of 11, with the lead in Annie, at the Bryggeteateret in Oslo (1991). Maria and her family moved to Oslo for the musical, and when the show run was over, they moved back to Senja.

She has since performed in several musicals, both in the capital Oslo, and in the county Troms where she grew up.

At the age of 24, she was part of Idol (Norway) in 2004, where she finished 6th. She took part in the Idol Tour 2004, along with other contestants in the top ten.

She released her debut solo album in 2005, which peaked at number 13 on the Norwegian album charts. The single "Breathing" peaked at number 5 and was certified Gold in Norway, while "Should've" peaked at number 20. She went on a four-month national tour to promote the album. "Should've" has the same chord structure as the Rolling Stones song "Beast of Burden" from their album Some Girls.

 Maria is the Norwegian representative to perform in the Eurovision Song Contest 2008 with the song "Hold On Be Strong", written by Mira Craig. On 12 February 2008 the song entered the Norwegian single charts at number 5, reaching number 1 on 19 February 2008.

Maria released her second studio album, Hold On Be Strong, on 28 April 2008 with help from Mira Craig.

Eurovision Song Contest 2008

Maria entered the qualifying rounds of the Melodi Grand Prix 2008 on 18 January and was voted through directly to the national final. In the final on 9 February, she received the highest number of votes from both the televoting and the jury, which made her the Norwegian representative in the Eurovision Song Contest 2008, which was held in Belgrade, Serbia. The song finished fourth in the first semi-final and qualified for the final, which took place on 24 May. Maria and the song did very well in the final, ending up in fifth place.

Eurovision Song Contest 2009
Maria was a co-host (together with Per Sundnes) of Melodi Grand Prix 2009, in which Alexander Rybak was selected as Norway's entry in the Eurovision Song Contest 2009.

Maria also participated in the Swedish Melodifestivalen 2009, singing "Killing Me Tenderly", with Anna Sahlene. They competed against seven other contestants in the fourth heat, in Malmö on 28 February 2009, and placed seventh out of eight acts.

Eurovision Song Contest 2010
On 4 December 2009 it was officially announced that Maria would participate in the Melodi Grand Prix 2010 the national contest which will decide the Norwegian entry for the Eurovision Song Contest 2010 to be held in Oslo after last year's Alexander Rybak victory. Maria's song is called "Make My Day" and is written by Merethe La Verdi and Mats Lie Skåre and is described as mid-tempo. On 8 January, the first heat of the Melodi Grand Prix 2010 was held in Orland and Maria won the semi and advanced to the Final in Oslo, where she did not come in the top four.

FIS Nordic World Ski Championships 2011
Maria performed the official theme song "Glorious" for the FIS Nordic World Ski Championships 2011 in Oslo, Norway.

Theatre (selected)

 1991–1992 Annie – as Annie (at Bryggeteateret in Oslo)
 1995–1996 Trollmannen fra Oz (en. The Wizard of Oz) – as Dorothy (at Det norske teatret in Oslo)
 2002 Thank You for the Music – ABBA Tribute (at Scene West in Oslo)
 2003 Fame – as Mabel Washington (at Chat Noir in Oslo)
 2005 Hamlet – as Ophelia (by Nordnorsk Scenekompani in Harstad and Tromsø)
 2006–2007 Hair – as Sheila Franklin (at Det Norske Teatret in Oslo)

Discography

The following article is a discography of albums and singles released by Norwegian artist Maria Haukaas Storeng.

Albums

Singles

Featured-on albums
 1991 "Annie" – den norske suksessversjonen
 2004 Idol – de 11 finalistene – track 3, "Don't Give a Damn" – (Album charts: number 2)
 2008 Melodi Grand Prix 2008 (Album charts: number 28)
 2009 Melodifestivalen 2009
 2010 Melodi Grand Prix 2010

Filmography 

 Kim Possible (TV) (Norwegian audio version) – sings the theme song – sings a ballad in one episode
 Chicken Little (Norwegian audio version) – sings "Ta Den Ut"
 Shrek the Third (Norwegian audio version) – Rapunsel (voice)

Self
 1999 Beat for Beat (TV) (Norwegian music show)
 2001 Du skal høre mye (TV)
 2003 Beat for Beat (TV)
 2004 Idol (TV)
 2004 Beat for Beat (TV)
 2005 Heia Tufte (TV)
 2007 Beat for Beat (TV)
 2008 Beat for Beat (TV)

See also
 Norway in the Eurovision Song Contest

References

External links
 
 

1979 births
Living people
People from Lenvik
Bonnier Amigo Music Group artists
Melodi Grand Prix contestants
Melodi Grand Prix winners
Eurovision Song Contest entrants for Norway
Eurovision Song Contest entrants of 2008
Idol (Norwegian TV series) participants
Norwegian pop singers
21st-century Norwegian singers
21st-century Norwegian women singers
English-language singers from Norway
Melodifestivalen contestants of 2009